Lavelle School for the Blind (LSB) is a private school for the blind in Baychester, Bronx, New York City. The Sisters of St. Dominic of Blauvelt operate the school. It has grades Kindergarten through 13, with one more than most U.S. school systems, and it serves ages 3-21. Its namesake is Monsignor Lavelle. It receives funding from the New York State Education Department.

History
It was established in 1904 by a Catholic blind woman, Margaret Coffey, and it was formerly known as the Catholic Institute for the Blind. It formally became a Catholic school in 1909 with the order of sisters beginning to operate the school in 1911. It moved to its current facility in 1916. For a period it served as a boarding school. It received its current name in 1938, and the New York state authorities began funding the school in 1942. It ended boarding in 1983.

In 1995 it had 101 students.

In 2020 it had 125 students. That year, as the COVID-19 pandemic in New York occurred, the Roman Catholic Archdiocese of New York gave the school $2,500 so it could buy seven tablet computers tailored to the school's needs.

Curriculum
In 1995 it had academic and life skills classes. It has a special Individual Education Program, with its own diplomas, for multiply impaired students.

Admissions
As of 1995 a student may attend if their vision, at a maximum corrected level, is at or below 20/200.

Activities
The school began offering baseball as a sport in 2020.

References

External links
 Lavelle School for the Blind

Private K-12 schools in New York City
Roman Catholic high schools in the Bronx
High schools in the Bronx
Schools for the blind in the United States
1904 establishments in New York (state)
Educational institutions established in 1904
Boarding schools in New York (state)